The Church of St Michael and All Angels is a Church of England parish church in Braydeston, Brundall, Norfolk. The church is a Grade I listed building and dates from the 13th century.

History
The church is located in Braydeston, a deserted medieval village to the east of Brundall, Norfolk.

Present day
On 25 September 1962, the church was designated a Grade I listed building.

This is located with the Benefice of Brundall, Braydeston and Postwick (also known as the Yare Valley Churches) in the Archdeaconry of Norfolk, Diocese of Norwich. The churchyard is still open for burials. The church uses the Book of Common Prayer during its services.

References

External links
 Parish website
 A Church Near You entry

Braydeston
Braydeston